Bayramdere Dam is a dam in Çanakkale Province, Turkey. It was built between 1999 and 2002.

See also
List of dams and reservoirs in Turkey

External links
DSI

Dams in Çanakkale Province
Dams completed in 2002
2002 establishments in Turkey